The One That Got Away is a 2018 Philippine television drama romance comedy series broadcast by GMA Network. Directed by Mark Sicat Dela Cruz and Rado Peru, it stars Lovi Poe, Max Collins, Rhian Ramos, and Dennis Trillo in the title role. It premiered on January 15, 2018 on the network's Telebabad line up replacing My Korean Jagiya. The series concluded on May 18, 2018 with a total of 88 episodes. It was replaced by Inday Will Always Love You in its timeslot.

The series is streaming online on YouTube.

Premise
A story about three women — Alex, Zoe and Darcy, who formed an unlikely friendship after discovering that in different times in their lives, they were romantically linked with the same guy, Liam.

Cast and characters

Lead cast
 Lovi Poe as Alexandra Rey "Alex" Makalintal-Ilustre
A workaholic cable network employee and an aspiring travel show host with a sunny disposition, everything she does is always on-schedule. Alex is also family-oriented and works hard to contribute to her family’s finances.
 Max Collins as Darlene "Darcy" Sibuyan-Sandoval 
Described as strong willed and practical, she is an outspoken and independent personal trainer who hates being dependent on others. Darcy lives alone in a small apartment and assists her siblings' financial support as much as she can.
 Rhian Ramos as Sophia Elizabeth "Zoe" Velasquez-Makalintal
A happy-go-lucky swimwear designer and social media personality, she comes from a rich family and lives in an upscale condominium. Zoe is also very desperate for love and attention, as she lacked parental love at a young age.
 Dennis Trillo as William Dominic "Liam" Ilustre
A smart and handsome entrepreneur, he comes from a wealthy family and lives in their ancestral home together with his nanny. Also into vintage things and an animal lover, Liam likes women with a good sense of humor, which happens to be the common trait among his former girlfriends — Zoe, Darcy and Alex.

Supporting cast
 Jason Abalos as Gael Harrison Makalintal
Alex's older brother, a single dad to a 4 year old boy, he works as a nurse for a living. He is a chick-magnet and goes on a lot of dates, but never introduced his girlfriends to his family.
 Ivan Dorschner as Iñigo Sandoval
A spoiled-by-his-trust-fund playboy who knows how to smooth-talk his way around ladies. He has a business degree but is reluctant to work in Liam's company, preferring to be traveler instead.
 Migo Adecer as Samuel "Sam" Isaac
Zoe's half-brother. He is deemed immature, irresponsible and undecided about what he really wants to be in his life, though he displays a talent in animation and music. He is ordered to manage his family's coffee shop business in the meantime,
 Snooky Serna as Fatima "Patty" Makalintal
 Bembol Roco as Pancho Makalintal
 Luz Valdez as Maria Delos Reyes
 Ervic Vijandre as Joni Sibuyan
 Ayra Mariano as Mikaela "Ekay" Makalintal
 Jason Francisco as Moi Padilla
 Patricia Ysmael as Onay Samartino
 Euwenn Aleta as Nicolas Monroe "Nemo" Makalintal
 Dea Formilleza as Barbara "Babs" Dacanay-Sibuyan
 Nar Cabico as Bonifacio "Bunny" Samson / Weslie "Wes"
 Elle Ramirez as Yvette
 Ashley Rivera as Paris
 Tintin Ng as Loreng
 Luz Fernandez as Mona
 Princess Guevarra as Armie
 Orlando Sol as Francis
 Myka Carel as Gigi

Guest cast
 Fabio Ide as Daniel
 Sophie Albert as Chanel
 Rodjun Cruz as Hugo
 Matthias Rhoads as Gordon
 Vince Vandorpe as Avi
 Dave Bornea as Andrew
 Renz Fernandez as Gabriel "Gab" Tan
 Kelley Day as Toni
 Marnie Lapuz as Cleo
 Pancho Magno as Paolo
 Klea Pineda as Julie
 Devon Seron as Diane
 Mark Olegario as James
 Solenn Heussaff as Georgina "George" Martel
 Faith da Silva as Chee
 Arianne Bautista as Beauty Martinez
 Aaron Yanga as Lance
 Lharby Policarpio as Nurse Red
 Lucho Ayala as Popoy
 Joemarie Nielsen as Rob
 Addy Raj as Ekay's love interest

Ratings
According to AGB Nielsen Philippines' Nationwide Urban Television Audience Measurement People in television homes, the pilot episode of The One That Got Away earned a 7.7% rating. The series got its highest rating on May 9, 2018 with a 10.2% rating.

References

External links
 
 

2018 Philippine television series debuts
2018 Philippine television series endings
Filipino-language television shows
GMA Network drama series
Philippine romantic comedy television series
Television shows set in the Philippines